F. T. Parks was an American college football coach. He served as the head football coach at the First District Agricultural School—now known as Arkansas State University—from 1911 to 1912, compiling a record of 4–2.

Head coaching record

References

Year of birth missing
Year of death missing
Arkansas State Red Wolves football coaches